Mount Regina is a mountain standing  WNW of Mount LeResche in the southern part of the Everett Range. Mapped by USGS from surveys and U.S. Navy photography, 1960–63.

Named by US-ACAN for Thomas Joseph Regina (* 1942), Photographer's Mate, US Navy, on C-130 aircraft flights in the 1968–69 season. He was a member of the McMurdo Station winter party in 1963.

References
 

Mountains of Victoria Land
Pennell Coast